My Official Wife is a 1914 American silent film directed by James Young and starring Clara Kimball Young, Harry T. Morey and Rose E. Tapley.
  The novel was first adapted to film in 1914 by Vitagraph Studios, starring Clara Kimball Young and Earle Williams, and directed by Young's husband James Young.  The movie opened on July 13, 1914.  Sime Silverman's review for Variety was mixed on the film, concluding that five-reels was too long, though he admitted that the scene of a boat being torpedoed at the end might go over well with audiences.  Though the story is set in Russia, Silverman noted that the film "never dares go into the open because it was made so far away from any place even resembling the land of the Czar that the studio posing and setting becomes extraordinarily obvious."

Clara Kimball Young later estimated she had appeared in more than 100 films before My Official Wife, but this was the film that launched her as a star.  When Motion Picture Magazine conducted a popularity contest in 1914, Earle Williams finished first and Young came in second.  (Mary Pickford came in third).  Young credited Vitagraph founder J. Stuart Blackton's supervision as responsible for the success of her emotional portrayal in the film.  But now a hot commodity, Young soon signed with Lewis J. Selznick.

Based on its prior success, Vitagraph re-issued the film in late 1916.

Speculation once abounded that Leon Trotsky appeared in the film as an extra, based in part on a shot of Young with a bearded man with a resemblance to the man.  Though this claim started appearing as early as 1918 and was vouched for by actors in the film, and was often repeated, the story was always specious and has been discredited.  Trotsky was not in the United States in 1914, and he denied reports made during his life about alleged film appearances.  The film also possibly had a young Rudolf Valentino as an uncredited extra, though this claim cannot be verified, as Vitagraph Studios head Albert E. Smith made a number of claims that later caused skepticism.

Though the full movie is now lost, two short clips were compiled in the 1931 Vitaphone short The Movie Album and still survive.  One of the clips includes "Trotsky", which was played up in the press promotion for the release.

Film cast

Helen Marie by Clara Kimball Young
Arthur Bainbridge Lenox by Harry T. Morey
Laura, his wife by Rose E. Tapley
Marguerite, their daughter by Mary Anderson
Basile Weletsky, her husband by Arthur Cosine
Baron Friederich, Chief of the Russian Secret Police by L. Rogers Lytton
Eugenie, his spy by Eulalie Jensen
Constantine Weletsky by Charles Wellesley
Olga, his wife by Louise Beaudet
Sacha, their nephew by Earle Williams
Sophie, their child by Helen Connelly

References

External links
 (1914)

1914 films
Films directed by James Young
American silent feature films
Vitagraph Studios films
American historical drama films
American black-and-white films
Lost American films
1910s historical drama films
1914 lost films
Lost drama films
1910s English-language films
1910s American films
Silent American drama films
Silent historical drama films